Magra is a rural residential locality in the local government areas (LGA) of Brighton (7%), Southern Midlands (9%) and Derwent Valley (84%) in the Hobart, Central and South-east LGA regions of Tasmania. The 2016 census recorded a population of 699 for the state suburb of Magra.
It is in the Derwent Valley a few kilometres north of New Norfolk.

Location and features
Magra is just over the hill from New Norfolk. It consists mainly of dwelling houses and farmland. Accommodation is also available as the area is popular with tourists. Notable features of Magra itself include the surrounding hills and the plantation of Lombardy Poplars. The site of the grave of Betty King, believed to be the first European white woman to set foot on Australian soil, is located in the vicinity of Magra.

History 
Magra was gazetted as a locality in 1970. It was previously known as Black River; the name was changed about 1912. It is believed to be an Aboriginal word for “day”.

Stanton Farmhouse, built in 1817 is located in Magra on Back River Road.

Magra Post Office opened on 1 June 1911 and closed in 1968.

Geography
Most of the boundaries are survey lines.

Road infrastructure 
Route C184 (Black Hills Road) passes through the south-west corner.

See also

References

External links
 https://web.archive.org/web/20130212154059/http://www.australiaforeveryone.com.au/places_newnorfolk.htm

Towns in Tasmania
Southern Tasmania
Localities of Derwent Valley Council
Localities of Southern Midlands Council
Localities of Brighton Council (Tasmania)